Behrouz Pakniat is an Iranian professional footballer who last played for Khayr Vahdat FK.

Club career
Pakniat played for Bargh Shiraz F.C. from 2003 to 2006. He then played for Sanaye Arak F.C. from 2006. In 2010, he was playing for Payam Mashhad F.C.

External links
 Behrouz Pakniat Official Blog

References

Living people
1977 births
People from Behbahan
Iranian footballers
Bargh Shiraz players
Payam Mashhad players
Expatriate footballers in Tajikistan
Iranian expatriate footballers
Association football midfielders
Tajikistan Higher League players
Sportspeople from Khuzestan province